Pablo Cuevas was the defending champion, but lost in the first round to Arthur De Greef.

Dominic Thiem won the title, defeating Pablo Carreño Busta in the final, 7–5, 6–4.

Seeds

Draw

Finals

Top half

Bottom half

Qualifying

Seeds

Qualifiers

Lucky losers
  Víctor Estrella Burgos

Qualifying draw

First qualifier

Second qualifier

Third qualifier

Fourth qualifier

References
 Main draw
 Qualifying draw

Rio Open - Singles
Rio
Rio Open